Operation Abrasion was a South African special forces military operation in December 1985 by the South African Defence Force (SADF) during the Angolan Civil War and South African Border War.

Background
The plan was to disrupt the supply caravanas (supply convoys) run by Cuban and FAPLA troops between Menongue and Cuito Cuanavale. The caravana's in the past were subject to attacks from landmines, UNITA and air attacks from the South African Air Force (SAAF). The caravana's differed in size but were said to consist of a bulldozer, a BTR-60, BMP-1 and an anti-aircraft vehicle, followed by 5 to 10 supply vehicles and then similar vehicles in the rear guard.  These caravana's could take up to 10 days to travel the 184 km journey between Menongue and Cuito Cuanavale.

The SADF team would consist of 50 special forces troops and seven Unimog Sabre vehicles and a component UNITA soldiers with the plan to conduct hit and run attacks against these convoys. The operation would begin on the 18 December 1985 and last until mid February 1986.

The SAAF component would consist of the use of C-130 transport aircraft to fly the special forces troops and their equipment into Mavinga, the use of Puma helicopters for medical rescue based in Rundu and Impala aircraft used as radio relays between the troops and headquarters.

References

Further reading
 
 

Conflicts in 1985
1985 in Angola
1985 in South Africa
Military history of Angola
Cross-border operations of South Africa
Battles and operations of the South African Border War
Operations involving South African special forces
December 1985 events in Africa
Military operations of the Angolan Civil War